Abuzar Garrison ( – Pādegān-e Abūẕar) is a village and military installation in Qaleh Shahin Rural District, in the Central District of Sarpol-e Zahab County, Kermanshah Province, Iran. At the 2006 census, its population was 1,312, in 370 families.

References 

Populated places in Sarpol-e Zahab County
Military installations of the Ground Forces of Islamic Republic of Iran Army